The Eravasci were a Celtic or Pannonian people who inhabited Transdanubia, including Gellért Hill, Dunaújváros, and Aquincum. Most of what we know about them comes from 
archaeology and Latin literature. The Roman ruins of Aquincum stand today and are a museum.

Very little is known about them. However, we do know that they were highly cultured. They moved in from the north in about the third or fourth centuries BC. The Eravasci worked with iron, created jewelry and pottery, and even minted their own coins out of silver. Most Celtic societies at this time did not use coins, so this makes the Eravasci stand out among other tribes. Despite being immensely cultured, they were quite powerless and minor in the ancient world. They founded Aquincum; this became a major Roman military base and civilian city.

The Romans conquered and annexed the Eravasci around 12 BC. There, they turned the existing settlement into Aquincum and made it a military and civilian hub. The territory of the Eravasci became the Roman providence of Pannonia Inferior with Aquincum as its capital. The Eravascian culture continued to thrive throughout the early Roman occupation. Evidence of this is found on tombstone reliefs, which pictures Celtic dress and jewelry. Aquincum eventually stationed one legion of 6,000 men and 500 cavalry by 89 AD as part of the Roman border protection system. The town prospered in the 2nd and 3rd centuries AD.  In 106 AD, Aquincum was given full Roman privileges. This gave them indoor heating, public baths, mosaics (which are on display in the museum), and two Amphitheaters (which are also on display). The amphitheaters staged military and civil displays. At the end of the 2nd century AD, Aquincum had 30,000 residents or more.

The Roman author Tacitus described them as having a Pannonian language, and the same language and culture as a tribe to the north, the Osi:
Whether however the Aravisci migrated into Pannonia from the Osi, a German race, or whether the Osi came from the Aravisci into Germany, as both nations still retain the same language, institutions, and customs, is a doubtful matter; for as they were once equally poor and equally free, either bank had the same attractions, the same drawbacks.

References

Historical Celtic peoples
Ancient tribes in Hungary
Tribes conquered by Rome
Tribes conquered by the Roman Republic